Fresno Dam is a dam on the Milk River, a tributary of the Missouri River, upstream of Havre, Montana. The dam is part of the Milk River Project, owned by the U.S. Bureau of Reclamation. It serves mainly to provide irrigation water and some of its capacity is also reserved for flood control. The dam was built between 1937 and 1939, and raised and overhauled in 1943 and 1951.

References

Buildings and structures in Hill County, Montana
United States Bureau of Reclamation dams
Dams in Montana
Dams completed in 1939